The following are the telephone codes in Liberia.

Calling formats
The NSN length is 7, 8 or 9 digits, depending on the number type.

List of allocations in Liberia

See also 
 Communications in Liberia

References

Liberia
Telecommunications in Liberia
Telephone numbers